Giorgi Beridze (born 12 May 1997) is a Georgian professional footballer who plays as a winger for Süper Lig club Ankaragücü and the Georgia national team.

Club career

Gent
A youth product of Zestafoni, Beridze moved to Dila Gori in 2013 and made his professional debut on 2 May 2014 in a 2–1 loss to WIT Georgia in the Umaglesi Liga. He returned shortly to Zestafoni in 2015, before being signed by Belgian Pro League club Gent later that year where he joined the youth academy.

Loans
In January 2017, Beridze joined Slovak Super Liga club Trenčín on a six-month loan. He made his debut for the club against Slovan Bratislava on 25 February 2017 and netted the equalizer in the match. He extended his contract with Gent until 2020 during his loan, which was also extended by another season. His efforts for Trenčín meant that he was awarded the award as player of the season.

Another two loan spells followed between 2018 and 2020 to Újpest and Lokeren, respectively. He scored his first goal for Lokeren on 26 September 2019 in the first minute of the Belgian Cup match against Antwerp which ended in a 4–2 loss.

Újpest
On 1 October 2020, Beridze joined Újpest on a permanent deal after his contract with Gent had expired. He made his return debut on 4 October, coming off the bench for Zoltán Stieber in the 66th minute before scoring in injury time in a 5–1 loss to Fehérvár.

Beridze won the Magyar Kupa in his first season at the club, becoming top goalscorer of the tournament as well with six goals.

Ankaragücü
Beridze signed with Süper Lig club Ankaragücü on 28 May 2022, joining the club on a two-year deal with an option for an additional year. He scored his first goals for the club on 4 September, bagging a brace in a 3–2 home loss to Beşiktaş.

International career
Beridze made his debut for Georgia national football team on 1 June 2018 in a friendly against Malta.

Career statistics

Club

International

Honours
Újpest
 Magyar Kupa: 2020–21

Individual
 Magyar Kupa top goalscorer: 2020–21

References

External links
   
 Giorgi Beridze at Futbalnet

1997 births
Living people
Footballers from Georgia (country)
Expatriate footballers from Georgia (country)
Georgia (country) youth international footballers
Georgia (country) under-21 international footballers
Georgia (country) international footballers
Association football forwards
FC Dila Gori players
FC Zestafoni players
K.A.A. Gent players
AS Trenčín players
Újpest FC players
K.S.C. Lokeren Oost-Vlaanderen players
MKE Ankaragücü footballers
Erovnuli Liga players
Slovak Super Liga players
Nemzeti Bajnokság I players
Challenger Pro League players
Belgian Pro League players
Süper Lig players
Expatriate footballers in Belgium
Expatriate footballers in Slovakia
Expatriate footballers in Hungary
Expatriate footballers in Turkey
Expatriate sportspeople from Georgia (country) in Belgium
Expatriate sportspeople from Georgia (country) in Slovakia
Expatriate sportspeople from Georgia (country) in Hungary
Expatriate sportspeople from Georgia (country) in Turkey